Mericisca is a genus of moths in the family Geometridae.

Species
Mericisca gracea
Mericisca scobina
Mericisca perpictaria

References

Geometridae